The Dear Hunter is an American progressive rock band originating in Providence, Rhode Island. It began as a side project of Casey Crescenzo when he was a member of the Receiving End of Sirens, before becoming his main band in 2006. The band's sound features a wide variety of instruments and styles.

Most of the band's albums, starting with their 2006 debut album Act I: The Lake South, the River North, are concept albums and a part of a common storyline, planned to conclude with a sixth installment. The most recent addition is 2016's Act V: Hymns with the Devil in Confessional. Additionally, they have released albums unrelated to the Acts; The Color Spectrum in 2011, Migrant in 2013, the EP All Is as All Should Be in 2017, and the most recent release being the album Antimai in 2022.

History

Origins
The band began as a side project of Casey Crescenzo when he was a full-time member of the Receiving End of Sirens. The Dear Hunter was originally intended as a vehicle for music Crescenzo had written that did not fit with the sound of the Receiving End of Sirens. Crescenzo affirmed that:

In the winter of 2005 Casey recorded the Dear Ms. Leading demos. He created 10 copies on burned CDs that were circulated amongst his friends and posted online for download. While elements and characters featured on the demos would reappear on the subsequent Acts, Crescenzo has confirmed that there was a transformation in how he represented these themes and persons; while the story had its origins in his personal life, the Acts removed most autobiographical elements in favor of fiction:

Act I: The Lake South, The River North (2007)
In May 2006, Casey was "asked to leave" the Receiving End of Sirens and began working on the Dear Hunter's first studio album. He expanded the scope of the project to a six-album story set at the dawn of the 20th century. The story revolved around the birth, life, and abrupt death of a boy known only as "The Dear Hunter." Crescenzo later remarked that the protagonist is "not a hero at all. I do not think he does a single good thing or smart thing in any of the stories." As Crescenzo summarized,

For Crescenzo, the decision to begin the story at the beginning of the 20th century was consciously chosen due to the events that would unfold in future acts:

In a 2007 interview, Casey stated at that time that he had the overall story of the Dear Hunter mapped out. Casey produced and recorded the EP by himself with the assistance of his brother on drums and mother on backing vocals. Act I: The Lake South, The River North was released in September 2006 on Triple Crown Records.

Shortly after the release of Act I, Casey recruited Luke Dent of the recently split band Faraway for vocals and keyboards and Erick Serna as a second guitarist. Luke brought in his brother Sam on drums and Erick brought long-time friend Josh Rheault in to play bass. The band entered the studio in late 2006 to record the follow-up to Act I. Recording finished in early 2007, during which time, the band was featured in Alternative Press' "100 Bands You Need to Know in 2007."

Act II: The Meaning of, and All Things Regarding Ms. Leading (2007)
Act II: The Meaning of, and All Things Regarding Ms. Leading was released May 22, 2007. Originally, the band had written almost 2 hours of music for the album, but managed to trim the run time down to 80 minutes so as to fit on a single compact disc. Act II reached No. 39 on the Billboard Heatseekers chart. The band supported the album by touring with As Tall As Lions, Saves the Day, Say Anything, Thrice, Chris Conley, The Format, Scary Kids Scaring Kids, Boys Night Out, Circa Survive, Ours, and Fear Before the March of Flames.

The band filmed a music video for the song "The Church and the Dime". A book based on the story of Act II was released as part of the deluxe edition of Act III: Life and Death. Artist Kent St. John was selected to do the illustrations.

Prior to a string of dates with Circa Survive, Josh Rheault and brothers Sam and Luke Dent left the band. Temporary replacements for the tour dates included Cliff Sarcona and Julio Tavarez of As Tall As Lions (drums and bass, respectively), Christopher Tagliaferro of Tiger Riot (bass), and Andy Wildrick of the Junior Varsity (guitar/keys). Wildrick later joined the band as a permanent member, along with Sagan Jacobson of Crown Atlantic on bass and Casey's brother Nick on drums.

The Dear Hunter embarked on their first headlining tour in mid-2008 with Lydia, Eye Alaska, and You, Me, and Everyone We Know. On December 9, 2008, it was announced that Nate Patterson, Casey's former bandmate in the Receiving End of Sirens, would begin playing bass for the band, as Sagan Jacobson had left.

Act III: Life and Death (2009)
After the headlining tour, the Dear Hunter entered the studio to record Act III: Life and Death. During this time, former bassist Josh Rheault announced on tour that he had rejoined the Dear Hunter on acoustic guitar, backing vocals, and keyboards. Act III was released on June 23, 2009 on Triple Crown Records.

The Color Spectrum (2011)
Between the release of Act II and Act III, Crescenzo was also conceiving a multi-album arc related to the color spectrum. On April 23, 2010, Crescenzo announced that the Dear Hunter would take a break from the Acts project to focus on this concept. He also stated that Act IV would most likely not be seen for quite some time. He later announced that the project, titled The Color Spectrum, would consist of nine EPs, each corresponding to a certain color (specifically, Black, Red, Orange, Yellow, Green, Blue, Indigo, Violet and White).

On February 24, 2011, Alternative Press announced the EPs would be released in multiple formats, including a physical CD containing select tracks from each of the EPs. At some point prior to the completion of The Color Spectrum, Josh Rheault and Erick Serna both left the band to pursue their respective musical projects. Subsequent to the release of The Color Spectrum, the Dear Hunter performed the entire three-hour set of EPs in a single show and released it as a DVD, entitled The Color Spectrum DVD.

Migrant (2013)
The Dear Hunter went in to the studio in 2012 with producer Mike Watts to record Migrant, the first album under Crescenzo's new imprint label, Cave & Canary Goods, which is a unit of Equal Vision Records. Prior to recording the album, Crescenzo expressed his excitement over working with Watts and further noted that

Migrant represents another deferral of the next Act record, a consideration that Crescenzo weighed before moving forward.

Migrant, which is the first album released by the Dear Hunter that does not have a concept, was released on April 2, 2013. Crescenzo remarked that the non-conceptual nature of Migrant presented a new challenge: "I've been in the rhythm of writing conceptually. It’s a challenge for me to be more transparent and more honest and more directly from the heart and not filtering it through something. So I think that was really exciting; it was really refreshing." Remarking on the less rock-oriented and relatively streamlined nature of Migrant, Crescenzo noted that:

Act IV: Rebirth in Reprise (2015)
On March 3, 2015 Casey Crescenzo announced that Act IV: Rebirth in Reprise was well underway and should be released by the end of 2015. This was announced in conjunction with the Dear Hunter's live album that was released the same day. The live album, The Dear Hunter – Live, features songs from the string quartet tour from mid-2013.

On June 16, the single "A Night on the Town" became available for streaming on the band's official website, and the album became available for preorder. On the preorder form, the release date of the album was said to be September 4, 2015. The album debuted at No. 39 on the Billboard 200 selling approximately 7,000 copies, both career highs for the band. The Dear Hunter then embarked on a Fall US Tour with bands CHON and Gates.

Act V: Hymns with the Devil in Confessional (2016)
On June 22, 2016 Casey Crescenzo announced via Facebook that Act V: Hymns with the Devil in Confessional was set for a September 9, 2016 release. The album debuted at #48 on the US Billboard 200 and #6 on the Independent Albums chart, becoming their 2nd best charting success so far. The band embarked on a month-long North American tour with Gavin Castleton and Eisley in late September, finishing with a show in San Francisco accompanied by Awesöme Orchestra. The show focused mainly on Act IV and V and a few tracks off the first Acts. In an interview with Pop Matters, Casey announced the next Dear Hunter record will be unrelated to the Acts.

All Is as All Should Be (2017)
On September 12, 2017, the Dear Hunter announced a headlining tour with the Family Crest and Vava. On September 13, the Dear Hunter announced a six track EP titled All Is as All Should Be. It was released on December 1, 2017 through Cave And Canary Goods.

The Fox and the Hunt (2020)
On February 14, 2020, the Dear Hunter released an orchestral LP in collaboration with composer Brian Adam McCune and San Francisco-based group Awesöme Orchestra through Cave and Canary Goods. The Fox and the Hunt repurposes and expands upon orchestral parts recorded for Act IV and Act V into a fully realized instrumental album.

Departure of Castleton, The Indigo Child, and S.S. Neverender (2021)
On June 12, 2021, Gavin Castleton announced his departure from the band via their Pillar account (a subscription-based online community in which the band actively participates). Castleton cited being at a point in his life that he cannot "[contribute] the appropriate time, energy and focus" that the "many amazing and ambitious TDH events and releases" would require. He also stated these events and releases were "on the near horizon." The band wished Castleton well in the same post.

On October 13, 2021, The Dear Hunter announced an upcoming event for their next release "The Indigo Child" set for October 22, 2021, on their Instagram and Facebook pages.

On October 22, 2021, the band released The Indigo Child EP, consisting of orchestral works based on their short film of the same name, and the future concept album saga.

On October 25–29, 2021, The Dear Hunter (along with touring keyboardist Aiden Earley) took part on the S.S. Neverender cruise along with Coheed and Cambria and many other bands.

Antimai (2022–)
On February 4, 2022, the Dear Hunter announced an upcoming American tour with special guests The World Is a Beautiful Place & I Am No Longer Afraid to Die, & Tanner Merritt of O'Brother.

On July 1, 2022, they released their eighth studio album Antimai through Cave and Canary. The album is the first record in the band's sci-fi/fantasy-themed "Indigo Child" saga, introducing the titular city, and its geographical and social structure on a fictional world. A follow-up album, Sunya is currently rumored to be out sometime Spring 2023.

Members

Current
 Casey Crescenzo – lead vocals, guitar, organ (2004–present), bass (2004–2007, 2010–2011)
 Nick Crescenzo – drums, percussion, backing vocals (2006, 2007–present)
 Maxwell Tousseau – guitar, keyboards, percussion, backing vocals (2010–present)
 Robert Parr – guitar, keyboards, backing vocals (2011–present)
 Nick Sollecito – bass, fancy dances (2011–present)
Touring
 Aiden Earley - keyboards (2021)

Former
 Erick Serna – guitar, backing vocals (2006–2011)
 Luke Dent – keyboard, guitar, percussion, backing vocals (2006–2007)
 Sam Dent – drums (2006–2007)
 Josh Rheault – guitar, keyboards, backing vocals (2007, 2009–2011)
 Andy Wildrick – guitar, keyboards, backing vocals (2007–2010)
 Sagan Jacobson – bass, backing vocals (2007–2008)
 Nate Patterson – bass, backing vocals (2008–2010)
 Connor Doyle – guitar (2010–2013)
 Andrew Brown – keyboards, backing vocals (2015–2016)
 Gavin Castleton – keyboards, backing vocals (2016–2021)

Timeline

Discography

Demos
 Dear Ms. Leading (2004)

Studio albums
 Act I: The Lake South, the River North (2006)
 Act II: The Meaning of, and All Things Regarding Ms. Leading (2007)
 Act III: Life and Death (2009)
 The Color Spectrum (2011)
 Migrant (2013)
 Act IV: Rebirth in Reprise (2015)
 Act V: Hymns with the Devil in Confessional (2016)
 The Fox and the Hunt (orchestral LP performed by Awesöme Orchestra, 2019)
 Antimai (2022)
 Sunya (2023)

Live
 The Color Spectrum – Live (2013)
 The Dear Hunter – Live (2015)

EPs
 Random EP No. 1 (2007)
 Random EP No. 2 (2008)
 The Branches EP (2010)
 Black EP (2011)
 Red EP (2011)
 Orange EP (2011)
 Yellow EP (2011)
 Green EP (2011)
 Blue EP (2011)
 Indigo EP (2011)
 Violet EP (2011)
 White EP (2011)
 The Migrations Annex (2013)
 All Is as All Should Be (2017)
 The Indigo Child (2021)

References

External links
 
 Lake and the River (The Dear Hunter Fansite)
 Cave & Canary Goods website

American post-hardcore musical groups
Alternative rock groups from Rhode Island
Musical groups established in 2005
Triple Crown Records artists
Musical groups from Rhode Island
Equal Vision Records artists